Laurette Séjourné (L’Aquila, October 24, 1914 – Mexico City, May 25, 2003) was a Mexican archeologist and ethnologist best known for her study of the civilizations of Teotihuacan and the Aztecs and her theories concerning the Mesoamerican culture hero, Quetzalcoatl.

Laurette Séjourné was born in L’Aquila, Italy, as Laura Valentini Corsa, although one also finds her mentioned as Laura Bianchi. Little is known about her early years; even her precise birth date is rarely mentioned. In her prime youth, she appears to have moved to France, perhaps in connection with the fascist take-over of 1922; in later life, she still wrote in French. She married a Frenchman, Séjourné, and participated in cultural life and the world of the cinema, meeting such figures as André Breton and Jean Cocteau. Strongly politicized like many others at the times, she divorced her husband, and became the partner of Viktor Kibalchich or Kibaltchitch (1890-1947), a Russian novelist and revolutionary also known as Victor Serge. She left occupied France in 1942 to join him in exile in Mexico. There, she became a naturalized Mexican citizen and married him. Soon after his death, she joined the Mexican Communist Party. Later, she remarried with Arnaldo Orfila, director of the Fondo de Cultura Económica and founder of Siglo XXI Editores.

Séjourné's militant spirit can be captured from a passage like the following one:

Later, her focus came to rest more and more on what to her was the embodiment of this Prehispanic 'utopia', Quetzalcoatl.

During the 1950s, Séjourné worked for Mexico's National Institute of Anthropology and History (INAH). She did anthropological fieldwork in Oaxaca, but then changed to the field of archaeology, excavating at the pre-Spanish metropolis of Teotihuacan, which she believed was the legendary Tollan. She published several beautifully illustrated books on the art and architecture of Teotihuacan. Although she was the first to recognize the discontinuity between Teotihuacan and the much later Aztec civilization, her archaeological work has been subject to criticism.

To a wider public she became known through her 1957 publication on the cosmology and religion of the Toltecs and Aztecs, translated into English as Burning Water: Thought and Religion in Ancient Mexico. The book's main focus is the figure of Tollan's priestly king, Quetzalcoatl, and his teachings. Five years later, there was a follow-up in Quetzalcoatls' Universe (El Universo de Quetzalcoatl, 1962). Perhaps influenced by the ideas of Carl Jung, or by the historian of religion, Mircea Eliade, with whom Séjourné maintained a correspondence, these books sketch a rather spiritualized image of king Quetzalcoatl and his legendary reign, referring to 'laws of interior preparation' supposedly left by the Toltec king and to advances 'along the road to spirituality' made possible by these.

Laurette Séjourné's final years were dedicated to bringing education to the Indian peoples of the south of Mexico. Her work is still valued by specialists.

Notes

Bibliography of Laurette Séjourné
Palenque, una ciudad maya, Mexico, Fondo de Cultura Económica, 1952. 
Supervivencias de un mundo mágico, imágenes de 4 pueblos mexicanos, dessins de Leonora Carrington, Mexico, Tezontle, 1953.
Pensamiento y religión en el México antiguo, Mexico, Fondo de Cultura Económica, 1957 ; English translation: Burning water, thought and religion in Ancient Mexico, Shambala 1976 [Thames & Hudson, 1957] ; La Pensée des anciens Mexicains, Paris, F. Maspero, 1966.
Un Palacio en la ciudad de los dioses, Teotihuacán, Mexico, Instituto nacional de antropología e historia, 1959.
El Universo de Quetzalcóatl, Fondo de Cultura Económica, 1962.
Arqueología de Teotihuacán, la cerámica, Fondo de Cultura Económica, 1966. 
Teotihuacan, métropole de l'Amérique, Paris, F. Maspero, 1969.
Antiguas culturas precolombinas, México, Siglo XXI de España editores, 1976.
El Pensamiento náhuatl cifrado en los calendarios, Siglo XXI, 1983.
[https://books.google.com/books?id=ORct_IoyBbUC&dq=laurette+sejourne&pg=PP1 Teotihuacan, capital de los Toltecas, Mexico, Siglo Veintiuno Editores, 1994] 
Cosmogonia de Mesoamérica, Mexico, Siglo veintiuno editores, 2004.

Correspondence
Ecris-moi à Mexico: correspondance inédite 1941-1942, Paris, Signes et balises, 2017. [Correspondence with Victor Serge]

References
Claudio Albertani, Recuerdo de Vlady (1920-2005). El pintor de la revolución social. In La Palabra y el Hombre no. 138 (Abril-Junio 2006).
Mircea Eliade, Journal II (1957-1969). University of Chicago Press, Chicago 1989.
Michel Graulich, Le “couple” Kibaltchitch et la civilisation mexicaine. In Socialisme, No. 226-227, July–October 1991.
Ian William Merkel, “Art, Archaeology and Socialism: The Life and Work of Laurette Séjourné, Interpreter of Mesoamerica,” in Bérose - Encyclopédie internationale des histoires de l'anthropologie, Paris, 2022. https://www.berose.fr/article2629.html?lang=en
Guadelupe Ortiz Elguea, Historia [del grupo editorial Orfila Valentini], www.orfilavalentini.com
Esther Pasztory, Teotihuacan: An Experiment in Living. Norman: University of Oklahoma Press 1997. 
Susan Weissmann, Victor Serge: The course is set on hope. Verso, London 2001.
Zavala Alonso, ed., Noticiario INAH: Laurette Séjourné, inspiración y reflexión para la arqueología mexicana. www.arts-history.mx

External links
. Emilio Cantón (dir.), Agua Quemada, Laurette Séjourné, la unión de los contrarios. Mexico: INAH 2005.

1911 births
2003 deaths
People from Perugia
French archaeologists
French Mesoamericanists
Mexican archaeologists
Mexican Mesoamericanists
Women Mesoamericanists
Naturalized citizens of Mexico
Mexican people of French descent
Italian people of French descent
Mesoamerican anthropologists
Aztec scholars
20th-century Mesoamericanists
20th-century archaeologists
Mexican women archaeologists